Novousmanovo (Yañı Uśman) is a rural locality (a village) in Baygazinsky Selsoviet, Burzyansky District, Bashkortostan, Russia. The population was 414 as of 2010. There are 7 streets.

Geography 
Novousmanovo is located 38 km east of Starosubkhangulovo (the district's administrative centre) by road. Baygazino is the nearest rural locality.

References 

Rural localities in Burzyansky District